There are more than 900 churches in Rome. Most, but not all, of these are Catholic.

The first churches of Rome originated in places where Christians met. They were divided into three main categories:
the houses of private Roman citizens (people who hosted the meetings of Christians also known as oratoria, oracula)
the deaconries (places where charity distributions were given to the poor and placed under the control of a deacon; the greatest deaconries had many deacons, and one of them was elected archdeacon)
other houses holding a titulus (known as domus ecclesia)

Tituli 

Pope Marcellus I (A.D. 306–308) is said to have recognized twenty five tituli in the City of Rome, quasi dioecesis. It is known that in 336, Pope Julius I had set the number of presbyter cardinals to 28, so that for each day of the week, a different presbyter cardinal would say mass in one of the four major basilicas of Rome, St. Peter's, Basilica of Saint Paul Outside the Walls, Basilica di Santa Maria Maggiore, and Basilica of St. John Lateran. In Stephan Kuttner's view, "...the Roman cardinal priests and bishops were 'incardinated' for permanent (though limited) purposes into the patriarchal basilicas while remaining bound nonetheless to the churches of their original ordination."

Only the tituli were allowed to distribute sacraments. The most important priest in a titulus was given the name of Cardinal. Pope Marcellus I (at the beginning of the 4th century) confirmed that the tituli were the only centres of administration in the Church. In AD 499, a synod held by Pope Symmachus listed all the presbyters participating, as well as the tituli who were present at that time:

 Titulus Aemilianae (Santi Quattro Coronati)
 Titulus Anastasiae (Santa Anastasia)
 Titulus SS Apostolorum (Santi Apostoli)
 Titulus Byzantis or Vizantis (unknown, perhaps "Titulus Pammachii")
 Titulus S Caeciliae (Santa Cecilia in Trastevere)
 Titulus Clementis (San Clemente)
 Titulus Crescentianae (San Sisto Vecchio)
 Titulus Crysogoni (San Crisogono)
 Titulus Cyriaci (Uncertain; theories include Santa Maria Antiqua and Santa Maria in Domnica)
 Titulus Damasi (San Lorenzo in Damaso)
 Titulus Equitii (San Martino ai Monti)
 Titulus Eusebi (Sant'Eusebio)
 Titulus Fasciolae (Santi Nereo e Achilleo)
 Titulus Gaii (Santa Susanna)
 Titulus Iulii (Santa Maria in Trastevere, identical with Titulus Callixti)
 Titulus Lucinae (San Lorenzo in Lucina)
 Titulus Marcelli (San Marcello al Corso)
 Titulus Marci (San Marco)
 Titulus Matthaei (in Via Merulana, destroyed in 1810)
 Titulus Nicomedis (in Via Nomentana, destroyed)
 Titulus Pammachii (Santi Giovanni e Paolo (Rome))
 Titulus Praxedis (Santa Prassede)
 Titulus Priscae (Santa Prisca)
 Titulus Pudentis (Santa Pudenziana)
 Titulus Romani (unknown, perhaps either Santa Maria Antiqua or Santa Maria in Domnica; whichever, the "Titulus Cyriaci" was not)
 Titulus S Sabinae (Santa Sabina)
 Titulus Tigridae (uncertain, perhaps Santa Balbina)
 Titulus Vestinae (San Vitale)

"Seven Pilgrim Churches of Rome" 

In the time of Pope Alexander II (1061-1073) those priests who served at St. Peter's Basilica were referred to as the seven cardinals of S. Peter's: septem cardinalibus S. Petri. The four basilicas had no cardinal, since they were under the direct supervision of the Pope. The Basilica of St. John Lateran was also the seat of the bishop of Rome. Traditionally, pilgrims were expected to visit all four basilicas, and San Lorenzo fuori le mura, Santa Croce in Gerusalemme, and San Sebastiano fuori le mura which constituted the Seven Pilgrim Churches of Rome. In the Great Jubilee in 2000, the seventh church was instead Santuario della Madonna del Divino Amore as appointed by Pope John Paul II.

Notable churches by construction time 
This is a list of churches of Rome cited in Wikipedia articles or with related files on Wikimedia Commons.

The churches are grouped according to the time of their initial construction: the dates are those of the first record of each church. The reader, however, should not expect the current fabric of the buildings to reflect that age, since over the centuries most have undergone reconstruction. Almost all the churches will thus appear considerably more recent, and as a patchwork of periods and styles.

Some interesting churches are now closed except on special occasions, such as weddings. These include: Santa Balbina, Santi Nereo e Achilleo, San Cesareo in Palatio and Sant'Urbano.

4th century
 

 Archbasilica of Saint John Lateran (324)
 Old St. Peter's Basilica (324)
 Santa Croce in Gerusalemme (325)
 Santa Susanna (330)
 San Marco (336)
 Santa Maria in Trastevere (340s)
 Santa Anastasia (early-4th century)
 Santa Maria in Ara Coeli
 Santa Bibiana (363)
 Santi Nereo e Achilleo (before 377)
 Saint Paul Outside the Walls (386)
 Santi Giovanni e Paolo (Rome) (398)
 Lateran Baptistery
 Santa Balbina
 San Sisto Vecchio
 San Clemente
 San Lorenzo in Lucina
 Santi Marcellino e Pietro
 San Lorenzo fuori le Mura
 Santa Pudenziana
 San Sebastiano fuori le mura
 Sant'Anastasia al Palatino
 San Marcello al Corso (probably late-4th century)
 Santi Bonifacio e Alessio
 San Martino ai Monti
 San Sisto Vecchio
 Sant'Ambrogio della Massima
 San Cesareo de Appia
 Santa Costanza 
 Santi Bonifacio ed Alessio
 San Martino ai Monti
 Santi Quattro Coronati
 San Crisogono

5th century

 Santi Quattro Coronati
 San Vitale (400)
 Santa Sabina (432)
 San Lorenzo in Lucina (430s)
 Santa Maria Maggiore (432)
 Santo Stefano Rotondo (460)
 Sant'Agata dei Goti (460s; originally Arian, the only Arian foundation to survive in Rome)
 San Giovanni a Porta Latina (late-5th century)
 Santa Cecilia in Trastevere
 San Crisogono
 Santa Maria Antiqua
 Santa Maria in Via Lata
 San Paolo alle Tre Fontane
 San Pietro in Vincoli, titular church for a cardinal-priest
 Santa Prisca
 Santo Stefano al Monte Celio (483)
 Sant'Agata de' Goti

6th century

 Santi Cosma e Damiano (527)
 Santi Apostoli
 Santa Lucia in Selci (514)
 San Pancrazio (early 6th century)
 Santi Apostoli (573)
 San Lorenzo fuori le Mura (580s)
 Santa Balbina (595)
 Santa Maria in Aracoeli
 Santa Maria in Cosmedin
 San Nicola in Carcere
 San Teodoro - in 2000 Pope John Paul II granted the Ecumenical Patriarchate of Constantinople and the Greek Orthodox community in Rome use of the church

7th century

San Lorenzo in Miranda (Temple of Antoninus and Faustina) (141 AD)
 Sant'Agnese fuori le mura (mid-7th century)
 Sant'Apollinare
 San Giacomo Scossacavalli (mentioned for the first time in 7th century)
 San Giorgio al Velabro
 San Lorenzo in Miranda (11th century, but possibly 7th century)
 Santi Luca e Martina (625)
 Santa Maria in Domnica
 Santa Maria ad Martyres (the rededicated Pantheon)
 San Saba (645)

8th century

 Sant'Angelo in Pescheria (755 or 770)
 Santa Prassede (800)
 Sant'Eustachio (795)
 San Silvestro in Capite (761)
 Sant'Agata in Trastevere

9th century

 Santa Francesca Romana
 Santa Passera (the name comes from "Abbas Cyrus", Father Cyrus)
 Basilica di Santa Prassede (822)
 San Lorenzo in Panisperna (late-9th century)
 Santi Celso e Giuliano
 Santi Nereo e Achilleo (814)
 Santa Maria in Domnica (822)
 San Giacomo alla Lungara
 Santo Stefano degli Ungheresi (lost)

10th century

 San Bartolomeo all'Isola (1000)
 Santa Maria in Via
 Santa Francesca Romana
 San Sebastiano al Palatino
 Santi Domenico e Sisto
 Sant'Urbano
 Santa Maria in Via (995)
 San Cosimato
 Santa Maria del Priorato Church (939)

11th century

 San Silvestro al Quirinale (before 1039)
 Santa Maria del Popolo (1099)
 San Lorenzo in Miranda (11th century, but possibly 7th century)

12th century

 San Lorenzo in Piscibus
 San Benedetto in Piscinula (at the beginning of the Trastevere in front of the Tiber Island)
 Sant'Andrea delle Fratte
 Santa Maria della Pietà
 Santi Michele e Magno (in Borgo)
 San Salvatore in Lauro
 San Salvatore alle Coppelle (1195)
 Santo Spirito in Sassia
 Santa Maria in Cosmedin (1123)
 San Gregorio Magno al Celio (late-12th century)
 San Gregorio della Divina Pietà or San Gregorio a Ponte Quattro Capi (after 1403)
 Santa Maria in Publicolis (1186)
 Santa Maria in Monterone (1186)
 San Macuto (1192)
 Santa Maria in Monticelli
 Santa Maria in Vallicella

13th century

 San Francesco a Ripa (1231)
 Sant'Eusebio (1238)
 Santa Maria sopra Minerva (mid-13th century)
 Santissime Stimmate di San Francesco (1297)
 Oratory of San Francesco Saverio del Caravita (1238)

14th century

 Santa Barbara dei Librai (1306)

15th century

 Sant'Onofrio al Gianicolo (1439)
 San Giacomo degli Spagnoli or Nostra Signora del Sacro Cuore (1450)
 Santa Maria del Popolo (1472)
 Santa Maria della Pace (1482)
 Sant'Agostino (1483)
 San Pietro in Montorio (1500), titular church for a cardinal-priest
 San Lorenzo in Damaso (15th century)
 Sant'Agostino (1483)
 San Bernardo della Compagnia (1418)
 Santa Dorotea (1475)
 San Giovanni Battista dei Genovesi (1481)
 San Giuliano dei Fiamminghi
 Santa Maria della Consolazione (1470)
 Santa Maria dell'Anima (1431)

16th century

 Santa Maria di Loreto (1507)
 Santa Maria in Porta Paradisi (rebuilt in 1523)
 Santa Caterina da Siena a Via Giulia (1526)
 Santa Maria dell'Orto (1567)
 Sant'Andrea in Via Flaminia, also known as Sant'Andrea del Vignola (1553)
 Santa Maria degli Angeli e dei Martiri (1561)
 San Giovanni in Oleo
 Santa Caterina dei Funari (1564)
 San Giovanni Battista Decollato (1504)
 Santa Maria della Pietà in Camposanto dei Teutonici
 Santa Maria in Traspontina (1566)
 Santa Maria dell'Orazione e Morte (1571)
 Sant'Eligio degli Orefici (1575)
 Santa Caterina a Magnanapoli (1575)
 Church of the Gesù (1580)
 Santa Maria dei Monti (1580)
 San Giovanni Calibita (1584)
 San Giovanni della Pigna (1584)
 Trinità dei Monti (1585)
 San Luigi dei Francesi (1589)
 Sant'Andrea della Valle (1590)
 Sant'Andrea degli Scozzesi (1592)
 Santa Maria Odigitria al Tritone (1594)
 Santa Maria in Monserrato degli Spagnoli (1594)
 Santa Maria dei Miracoli (1597)
 Santissima Trinità dei Pellegrini (1597)
 San Bernardo alle Terme (1598)
 Sant'Andrea in Via Flaminia (1554)
 Santi Bartolomeo ed Alessandro dei Bergamaschi (1591)

17th century

 Santa Maria della Concezione dei Cappuccini (1631)
 San Carlo ai Catinari (1641)
 Santa Maria dei Miracoli and Santa Maria in Montesanto
 Santa Maria Maddalena (1699)
 San Giacomo in Augusta (1600)
 Sant'Andrea al Quirinale (1670)
 San Giovanni dei Fiorentini (1602)
 Sant'Andrea delle Fratte (1604)
 Santo Stefano del Cacco (1607)
 Santa Maria della Scala (1610)
 Santa Maria della Vittoria (1620)
 Santi Ambrogio e Carlo (1612)
 San Callisto (1613)
 San Paolo alla Regola (1613) cardinal deaconry since 1946
 Santa Maria della Vittoria (1620)
 Santi Benedetto e Scholastica (1625)
 San Bernardino in Panisperna (1625)
 Sant'Ignazio (1626)
 Sant'Egidio (1630)
 San Nicola dei Lorenesi (1632)
 Domine Quo Vadis (1637)
 Sant'Antonio dei Portoghesi (1697)
 San Carlo alle Quattro Fontane (1641)
 Santa Maria dei Sette Dolori (1655)
 Sant'Andrea della Valle (1650)
 Santi Vincenzo e Anastasio a Trevi (1650)
 Sant'Agnese in Agone (1652)
 Sant'Ivo alla Sapienza (1662)
 San Giuseppe dei Falegnami (1663)
 Santa Maria in Campitelli (1667)
 San Carlo al Corso (1669)
 Santa Maria in Montesanto (1675)
 Gesù e Maria (1675)
 Sant'Andrea al Quirinale (1678)
 Santa Maria del Suffragio (1685)
 San Bonaventura al Palatino (1689)
 San Michele a Ripa (1693)
 Santa Maria in Via Lata
 San Francesco a Monte Mario (1676)
 Santa Croce alla Lungara (1619)

18th century

 Santi Claudio e Andrea dei Borgognoni (1731)
 Santi Celso e Giuliano
 Santissimo Nome di Maria al Foro Traiano (1735)
 Santa Maria Annunziata in Borgo (1745)

19th century

 Santa Chiara (1890)
 St. Alphonsus Liguori Church (1859)
 St Paul's Within the Walls (1880)
 Sant'Antonio da Padova in Via Merulana (1884)
 St Andrew's Church (1885)
 Chiesa di Sant'Anselmo all'Aventino (1892–1896)
 Sacro Cuore di Gesù a Castro Pretorio (1887)
 San Giorgio e Martiri Inglesi (1887)
 Sant'Alfonso di Liguori (1859)
 Sant'Anselmo all'Aventino (1896)
 Madonna dell'Archetto (1851)

20th century

 Christuskirche (1910–1922)
 Gran Madre di Dio (1933)
 San Camillo de Lellis (1910)
 Santa Croce in Via Flaminia (1918)
 Sacro Cuore di Cristo Re (1920–1934)
 Santa Maria Ausiliatrice (1936)
 Santi Angeli Custodi a Città Giardino (1922), parochial church since 1926
 Nostra Signora di Guadalupe a Monte Mario (1928–1932)
 Gran Madre di Dio (1933–1937)
 San Giovanni Battista dei Cavalieri di Rodi (1946)
 Sant'Eugenio (1942–1951)
 Sacro Cuore di Maria (1952)
 Ss. Pietro e Paolo a Via Ostiense (1938–1955)
 Santa Maria Addolorata a piazza Buenos Aires (1910–1930)
 San Gregorio VII (1961)
 San Policarpo all'Acquedotto Claudio (1960), parochial church; since 2015 also (youngest?) titular church for a Cardinal-priest
 Santissimo Nome di Maria in Via Latina (1981)
 Santa Sofia a Via Boccea (1968) (Ukrainian Greek Catholic Church)
 Santa Teresa (1902)
 Sant'Elena (1914)

21st century

 Dio Padre Misericordioso (2003)
 Santa Caterina Martire (built in 2004, consecrated in 2009) - first Russian Orthodox church in Rome

See also 
 Architecture of Rome
 Religion in Rome

References

Sources
 
 
 
 H. W. Klewitz, "Die Entstehung des Kardinalskollegiums," Zeitschrift der Savigny-Stiftung für Rechtsgeschichte. Kanonische Abteilung 25 (1936), 115–221.
 Krautheimer, R., Corpus Basilicarum Christianarum Romae, vol. 3.

External links

 Thayer's Churches of Rome, including the books by Christian Huelsen, Mariano Armellini, and Filippo Titi
 Clarke's Churches of Rome
 Map of titular churches

Christian buildings and structures in the Roman Empire
Rome
Rome-related lists